Wesley Cox (born January 27, 1955) is a former National Basketball Association (NBA) basketball player for the Golden State Warriors. In 1977, Wesley was drafted with the eighteenth pick by the Golden State Warriors. He played two seasons in the NBA, averaging 4.6 points per game and 2.8 rebounds per game.

As a high school player, Cox was named a third-team All-American by Parade Magazine in 1973.

References

1955 births
Living people
African-American basketball players
Basketball players from Louisville, Kentucky
Golden State Warriors draft picks
Golden State Warriors players
Louisville Cardinals men's basketball players
Louisville Male High School alumni
Parade High School All-Americans (boys' basketball)
Small forwards
American men's basketball players
21st-century African-American people
20th-century African-American sportspeople